Sid Ahmed Aouadj (born July 2, 1991 in Oran) is an Algerian footballer who plays as a midfielder for Al-Zulfi.

Club career
On May 13, 2010, Aouadj made his professional debut for MC Oran in a league game against WA Tlemcen. He started the game before being subbed off in the 64th minute.

On 5 August 2021, Aouadj joined Saudi Arabian club Al-Kholood.

International career
On November 2, 2010, Aouadj was called up to the Algerian Under-23 National Team for a pair of friendlies against Tunisia.

In July 2011, Aouedj was selected as part of Algeria's squad for the 2011 Military World Games in Rio de Janeiro, Brazil. On July 24, 2011, in the final against Egypt, Aouedj scored the only goal of the game in the 16th minute to help Algeria win its first World Military Cup.

On November 16, 2011, he was selected as part of Algeria's squad for the 2011 CAF U-23 Championship in Morocco.

Honours
Won the World Military Cup once with the Algerian National Military Team in 2011

References

External links

Mouloudia.com Profile

1991 births
Living people
Algerian footballers
Algerian expatriate footballers
Algeria youth international footballers
Algeria under-23 international footballers
2011 CAF U-23 Championship players
Algerian Ligue Professionnelle 1 players
UAE First Division League players
Saudi First Division League players
Saudi Second Division players
MC Oran players
JS Kabylie players
MC Alger players
ES Sétif players
JS Saoura players
CS Constantine players
Dibba Al-Hisn Sports Club players
Al-Kholood Club players
Bisha FC players
Al-Ansar FC (Medina) players
Al-Zulfi FC players
Association football midfielders
Association football wingers
Expatriate footballers in the United Arab Emirates
Algerian expatriate sportspeople in the United Arab Emirates
Expatriate footballers in Saudi Arabia
Algerian expatriate sportspeople in Saudi Arabia
Footballers from Oran
21st-century Algerian people